Holmesdale, also known as the Vale of Holmesdale, is a valley in South-East England that falls between the hill ranges of the North Downs and the Greensand Ridge of the Weald, in the counties of Kent and Surrey. It stretches from Folkestone on the Kent coast, through Ashford, Harrietsham, Maidstone, Riverhead/Sevenoaks, Westerham, Oxted, Godstone, Redhill, Reigate, Dorking, Gomshall, and Guildford – west of which it is also called by the local name of "Puttenham Vale" – as it continues through the village of Puttenham, to the market town of Farnham.

Geology
Holmesdale is part of the Weald Basin and Weald-Artois Anticline. The valley is bordered on its north side by the chalk escarpment of the North Downs, and on its south side by the dip slope of the Greensand Ridge.

The valley's composition is primarily Gault Clay and Upper Greensand, with Lower Chalk wash at the foot of the Downs along its north edge and eroded Lower Greensand at its south edge also forming part of the valley floor in places. The vale gently ascends and descends several times along its length, with higher elevations near Lenham and Westerham (in Kent), and Wotton (in Surrey) acting as drainage divides for the valley's several drainage basins and rivers.

Rivers
The valley is part of the drainage basins of the rivers Stour and Medway; and the Thames tributaries the Darent and Mole.

Transport
The M25 motorway runs westward along Holmesdale after descending through the North Downs near Sevenoaks (Junction 5), before ascending up the downs again at Reigate (Junction 8). The A25 road connects the towns and villages in Holmesdale from Wrotham Heath to Shere, alternating between running in the valley and running along the Greensand Ridge. At Shere the A25 ascends the downs, passing over the top at Newlands Corner, to run north of the downs to Guildford.

The North Downs railway line runs along the valley from Redhill to Gomshall.

Usage of the term
Local businesses, schools, and clubs use the valley's name, for example the Holmesdale Building Society in Reigate; The Holmesdale School in Snodland; and the Holmesdale Natural History Club, founded in 1857, which runs a museum of the same name in Reigate.

See also 

Geology of Kent
Geology of Surrey
 Greensand Ridge
 North Downs
 Vale of Kent
 Weald

References

Valleys of Kent
Valleys of Surrey